Bláfjöll ("blue fells") are a small mountain range in the southwest of Iceland on Reykjanes peninsula at about 30 km from Reykjavík.

They form sort of a double mountain massif to the west and in the east of Jósepsdalur on Hellisheiði.

Geography

The mountain massif has a length of about 9 km. The highest mountain is Hákollur  (685 m).

Geology
The Bláfjöll are Pleistocene subglacial volcanoes and part of the Brennisteinsfjöll volcanic system.

Winter sports
The area is the most popular ski resort for the inhabitants of Iceland's Capital City Area.

The winter sports area is situated at elevations between 460 and 700 m.

15 km of easy and intermediate slopes for skiing and snowboarding as well as 15 lifts (tow lifts and chair lifts) are available as well as possibilities for night skiing. Cross country skiing is also possible. Two huts with accommodation and restaurant provide service for the guests. All this makes it the largest ski resort in Iceland.

Accessibility
From Reykjavík the Hringvegur is followed in southern direction, at the airfield of Sandskeið taken the Route 417 in direction of Hafnarfjörður/Bláfjöll, but up on the lava plateau turned left into the short Bláfjallavegur/Route 407. It leads directly to the mountains and the skiing area.

Nature protection

See also
 Eldborg í Bláfjöllum
 Heiðin há
 Brennisteinsfjöll
 Sports in Iceland

External links
 https://skidasvaedi.is/english/  Official website, ski resorts of Iceland
  Skídasvaedi.is, description with map of hiking and cross country ski tracks. Retrieved 6 August 2020.
 Bláfjöll. The Environment Agency of Iceland. (in Icelandic, with map of Bláfjallafólkvangur, the protected area)

References

Mountains of Iceland
Reykjanes Volcanic Belt
Subglacial volcanoes of Iceland
Brennisteinsfjöll Volcanic System